Bravid Washington Harris (January 6, 1896 - October 21, 1965) was bishop of the Episcopal Diocese of Liberia, serving from 1945 to 1964. He was consecrated on April 17, 1945.

References 
Archives of the Episcopal Church

1896 births
1965 deaths
Bishops of the Episcopal Church (United States)
20th-century American Episcopalians
Anglican bishops of Liberia
20th-century American clergy